Phonsavan (also spelled Phonesavanh, Lao: ໂພນສະຫວັນ), population 37,507, is the capital of Xiangkhouang Province. Phonsavan was built in the late-1970s and replaced the old Xiangkhouang (today: Muang Khoune) which was destroyed during the Second Indochina War.

Phonsavan is known for the nearby Plain of Jars, a UNESCO World Heritage site. The main economic activities in Phonsavan are based on governmental administration, mining by Chinese and Australian companies, tourism, and the work of non-governmental organizations (NGOs) clearing unexploded ordnance (UXO).

History 
While the origin of the Plain of Jars people is unknown, the recorded history of Xiangkhouang is interlinked with the Tai Phuan. The Tai Phuan or Phuan people are a Buddhist Tai-Lao ethnic group that migrated to Laos from southern China and by the 13th century had formed the independent principality Muang Phuan at the Plain of Jars with Xiangkhouang (the contemporary Muang Khoun) as the capital. They prospered from the overland trade in metals and forest products. In the mid-14th century, Muang Phuan was incorporated into the Lane Xang Kingdom under King Fa Ngum.

The Phuan population were able to retain a high degree of autonomy although they had to pay tax and tribute to Lan Xang. During the 16th century expressive Buddhist art and architecture flourished. The capital was dotted with temples in a distinct Xiangkhouang style, i.e., simple low roofs with a characteristic "waist" at the foundation. In 1930 Le Boulanger described it as "a large and beautiful city protected by wide moats and forts occupying the surrounding hills and the opulence of the sixty-two pagodas and their stupas, of which the flanks concealed treasures, obtained the capital a fame that spread fear wide and far."

After the Kingdom of Siam, contemporary Thailand, extended control to Lao territories east of the Mekong in the 1770s, Muang Phuan became a Siamese vassal state and also maintained tributary relations with Dai Viet (Vietnam). To exert greater control of the lands and people of Muang Phuan, the Siamese launched three separate campaigns (1777–1779, 1834–1836, and 1875–1876) to resettle large parts of the Phuan population to the south in regions under firm Siamese control. Subsequent invasions by Haw marauders, splinter groups of ex-Taiping Revolution rebels from southern China plundered Luang Prabang and Xiangkhouang in the 1870s, and desecrated and destroyed the temples of the Phuan region.

The Franco-Siamese treaties of the 1890s placed Xiangkhouang under colonial rule as part of French Indochina until shortly after World War II. The French used Xiangkhouang as their provincial capital. A few ruined colonial public buildings remain, such as the governor's residence, church, and the French school.

During the Laotian Civil War, Xiangkhouang was the scene of extensive ground battles and intense aerial bombardment due to its strategic importance. Houaphanh and Xiangkhouang Provinces had been strongholds of the Pathet Lao forces and their Vietnamese allies. The heavy aerial bombardments to neutralize those forces or to drop unused ordnance after returning from missions in Vietnam turned the Laos into the most heavily bombed nation in world history.

Phonsavan has been built since the fighting ended in the 1970s to replace the former provincial capital, Muang Khoun (also, Xiang Khouang), which was destroyed during the strife.

Climate 
Phonsavan has humid subtropical climate (Köppen Cwa) tempered by its high elevation (1,100 m). The city has long, warm, wet summers and short, dry winters. Average June temperature is 23.6 °C, average December (the coldest month) temperature is 14.8 °C.

See also
Ban Phou Pheung Noi

References

External links

Eco-tourism Laos

Populated places in Xiangkhouang Province
Socialist planned cities